The United Development Party (sometimes translated as Development Unity Party; abbreviated PPP) is an Islam-based political party in Indonesia. Due to its distinctive logo, the party is known as the "Kaaba Party".

The PPP was formed in 1973 as a result of the merger between several Islam-based parties, assuming the role of umbrella party for Muslims. After the Suharto regime, it once again became  an Islamist party in the early Post-Suharto era. Today it is considered a nationalist Islamist party which conforms with Pancasila doctrine and no longer upholds sharia as a main goal.

The party was led by Suryadharma Ali until 2014 when he was prosecuted for corruption. From 2014 to 2016 the party was split in the dispute over its chairmanship. In April 2016, Muhammad Romahurmuziy was declared a new chairman after a reconciliation congress. In the 2014 election, the party won 6.53 of the popular vote, an increase from the 5.33 percent it won in 2009 but lower than 8.15 percent of 2004.

History

Origins 
Ten political parties participated in the 1971 legislative elections, a number that President Suharto considered to be too many. Suharto wished that political parties be reduced to just two or three and that the parties should be grouped based on their programs.

The basis for the merger that would result in the birth of the PPP was a coalition of the four Islamic Parties in the People's Representative Council (DPR) called the United Development Faction. This faction consisted of Nahdatul Ulama (NU), the Muslim Party of Indonesia (Parmusi), the Islamic Association Party of Indonesia (PSII) and the Islamic Education Movement (Perti).

With encouragement by the Government, officials from all four parties had meetings with each other and after finding some common ground, merged the four Islamic parties in Indonesia into the United Development Party on 5 January 1973. Despite this formal merging of the parties however, internal PPP politics under the Suharto government were dominated by the differing priorities of the original groups that formed the party.

Opposition to the New Order 

In the mid-1970s, popular support for Suharto's regime was rapidly waning. When Suharto had seized power with a bloody military coup in 1965 and ousted President Sukarno, the Islamic groups had supported Suharto and aided in persecuting his political opponents. But as the regime had become corrupt and even more authoritarian, this alliance began to crumble. As the 1977 legislative elections approached, many began to seek  other options to vote for aside from the government-backed Golkar.

Worried that the PPP might win the elections, Suharto played on the fears of the people by having the military arrest a group of people who claimed to be associated with the Jihad Commando (Komando Jihad). With this some people became worried that to vote for the PPP and its Islamic leaning would mean expressing support the Jihad Commando and in a government growing increasingly authoritarian, many simply refused to be associated with the wrong side. Golkar would go on to win the legislative elections with 62% with the PPP coming second with 27% of the votes.

The PPP however, would not sit back and accept defeat. At the 1978 MPR General Session, PPP member Chalid Mawardi launched a scathing criticism of Suharto's regime. Mawardi accused the Government of being anti-Muslim, complained about the government's violent crackdown of dissent, and alleged that the 1977 Legislative Election was won because of electoral fraud. PPP members also conducted a mass walkout when Suharto referred to religions as "streams of beliefs".

The PPP seemed to have cemented itself a status as the strongest opposition party. It would not last long however. In 1984, NU, under its Chairman, Abdurrahman Wahid withdrew from the PPP,  severely weakening it. The PPP vote share fell from almost 28% in the 1982 legislative elections to 16% in the 1987 legislative elections, the PPP was also forced by the government to replace its ideology of Islam with the national ideology of Pancasila and to stop using Islamic symbols. As a result, the party replaced its logo showing the Kabah shrine in Mecca with a star.

1988 MPR general session 
At the 1988 MPR General Session, Jailani Naro, the PPP Chairman, was nominated as vice-president. Suharto, who had been elected to the presidency for a fifth term at the aforementioned General Session, intervened. He cited a decision that the MPR made in 1973 that one of the criteria for a vice-president was that he should be able to work with the president. Suharto also conducted discussions with Naro and convinced him to withdraw the nomination.

What Naro did was unprecedented as both Suharto and his vice presidents had always been elected unopposed. The problem this time was Suharto's choice for vice-president, Sudharmono. Suharto's choice had caused a rift between him and his most loyal ally ABRI. Many within ABRI did not like Sudharmono because he spent more time behind a desk (Sudharmono was a military attorney) then as a field officer. Seeing a gap to exploit, Naro nominated himself possibly with the private support of ABRI who in public, had shown support for Sudharmono.

The PPP in the Reform era 

The PPP continued as the second biggest party out of the three allowed in the New Order. In May 1998, after Suharto's fall, the PPP returned to its Islamic ideology and prepared itself for the 1999 legislative elections, where it won 11% of the vote.

In the 1999 MPR General Session, the PPP was part of the Central Axis, a political coalition of Muslim parties which was formed by MPR Chairman, Amien Rais to counter the dominance of Megawati Sukarnoputri's Indonesian Democratic Party-Struggle (PDI-P). The PDI-P had won the legislative election and Megawati was expected to win the presidency. However, the MPR was still at this stage responsible for electing the president and vice-president and the Muslim parties in the Central Axis did not want a female president. Instead, they nominated and successfully secured the election of Abdurrahman Wahid as president. In the vice-presidential election, PPP Chairman Hamzah Haz ran against Megawati and was defeated.

The PPP was the first of Wahid's political allies to become disillusioned with him. The PPP's main problem with Wahid was his visit to Israel and the suggestion that he was willing to re-establish diplomatic relations with that nation. Hamzah who served in Wahid's Cabinet as Coordinating Minister for People's Welfare, immediately resigned from his position just a month after Wahid had appointed him to it. Many other Wahid allies would follow and in July 2001, the PPP would join in removing Wahid from the Presidency and naming Megawati as the president. Hamzah was then elected as vice-president after defeating Susilo Bambang Yudhoyono and Akbar Tanjung in the vice presidential election.

2004 legislative elections 
The PPP won 8.1% of the vote in the 2004 legislative elections, a decrease from its 10.7% share of the vote in 1999, but enough to retain its place as the third-best represented party in the legislature, behind the PDI-P and Golkar.

2004 presidential elections 
The PPP originally did not have a presidential candidate in mind for the 2004 presidential elections. They had expected that Hamzah would be picked as Megawati's running mate and continue the Megawati/Hamzah President/Vice President partnership. Megawati however, chose NU Chairman Hasyim Muzadi as her running mate.

The PPP then continued to wait, still expecting that Hamzah Haz would be picked as a vice-presidential candidate. Finally, a day before the registration of presidential/vice-presidential candidates was closed, Hamzah moved forward and became the PPP's presidential candidate. His running mate was Agum Gumelar, who served as Minister of Transportation in Megawati's Cabinet. Hamzah's presidential run was unsuccessful as he received only 3.1% of the vote and came fifth.

In August 2004, the PPP announced that it was forming a national coalition with the PDI-P, Golkar, the Reform Star Party (PBR) and the Prosperous Peace Party to back Megawati to win the presidential run-off against Susilo Bambang Yudhoyono. Yudhoyono however would emerge victorious and the PPP would defect from the national coalition to Yudhoyono's camp. They were rewarded by being given cabinet places.

2007 party congress 
The PPP held its 6th National Congress in Jakarta from 30 January to 3 February 2007. On the last day of the Congress, Suryadharma Ali emerged as the new PPP Chairman to replace Hamzah. Suryadharma served as Minister of Cooperatives and State and Medium Enterprises in President Yudhoyono's Cabinet. He announced that he would continue as minister while concurrently holding the position of PPP Chairman.

2009 legislative election 
The party came sixth in the 2009 legislative election with 5.3 percent of the vote, winning 37 seats in the People's Representative Council. Throughout the election, the party obtained votes from the elderly Muslim men throughout rural and urban area, inside and outside of Java.<ref>Hwang, Julie Chernov. (2014). “Patterns of normalization: Islamist parties in Indonesia”, in Quinn Mecham and Julie Chernov Hwang (Eds.), Islamist parties and political normalization in the Muslim world. Philadelphia:University of Pennsylvania Press. p.68.</ref>

 Party platform 
The party's vision is to bring about a nation that is just, prosperous, moral and democratic and that upholds the law, respects human rights and that holds in high esteem the dignity of mankind and social justice based on the values of Islam. The party believes that religion (Islam) has an important role to play as a moral guidance and inspiration in the life of the nation. It is committed to improving the quality of democracy in Indonesia and respects freedom of expression, opinion and organization, the realization of good governance and the endeavor to preserve the unitary Republic of Indonesia based on Pancasila and the 1945 Constitution. It supports the concept of a people-based economic system, economic justice, the creation of jobs, the eradication of poverty, state control of sectors of the economy that have a controlling influence on the lives of the majority, a major role for state-owned companies, and economic independence.

 Chairman 
 Muhammad Syafaat Mintareja (1973–1978)
 Jailani Naro (1978–1989)
 Ismail Hasan Metareum (1989–1998)
 Hamzah Haz (1998–2007)
 Suryadharma Ali (2007–2014)
 Muhammad Romahurmuziy (2014–2019)
 Suharso Monoarfa (2019–2022)
 Muhamad Mardiono (2022–present)

 Election results 

 Legislative election results 

 Presidential election results Note: Bold text indicates PPP member''

References

External links 
  

 
Conservative parties in Indonesia
1973 establishments in Indonesia
Political parties established in 1973
Political parties in Indonesia
Pancasila political parties
Islamic political parties in Indonesia
Social conservative parties